Samuel Huston may refer to:

 Samuel B. Huston (1858–1920), American politician and lawyer
 Samuel Wesley Huston (1873–1933), politician in Saskatchewan, Canada
 Samuel Huston of Marengo, Iowa who helped establish Samuel Huston College

See also
 Sam Houston (1793–1863), American politician and soldier